No. 138 Squadron RAF was a squadron of the Royal Air Force that served in a variety of roles during its career, last disbanded in 1962. It was the first 'V-bomber' squadron of the RAF, flying the Vickers Valiant between 1955 and 1962.

History

Formation in World War I as fighter squadron
No. 138 Squadron RAF was originally to be formed as a fighter unit on 1 May 1918, but formation was suspended until officially formed on 30 September 1918 as a fighter-reconnaissance squadron at Chingford, and was disbanded there on 1 February 1919.

Special Duties in World War II
During World War II, it was reformed in 1941, from the expansion of No. 1419 Flight, and was the first squadron of the Royal Air Force Special Duty Service. In February 1942 the squadron's Lysander flight and a number of its Whitleys were hived off to make the nucleus of 161 (Special Duty) Squadron. Based initially at RAF Stradishall, in March 1942, 138 Squadron moved to its permanent home at the clandestine airfield at RAF Tempsford. The squadron dropped supplies and agents for the SIS and the SOE to Axis occupied territory. From October 1941 there served several all-Polish volunteer crews. Between 1 April 1943 and November 1943 the squadron included Polish Special Duties Flight, as C Flight. It carried out this role until March 1945 when it was reassigned to Bomber Command, operating under No. 3 Group. It was disbanded on 1 September 1950.

V-Bomber squadron post-war

On 1 January 1955 the squadron was reformed as the first squadron to be equipped with the Vickers Valiant strategic nuclear bomber, based at RAF Gaydon and later moving to RAF Wittering. It flew them from Malta during the Suez Crisis of October 1956, and was finally disbanded on 1 April 1962.

Aircraft operated

See also
 No. 301 Polish Bomber Squadron

References

Notes

Bibliography

 Bowyer, Michael J.F. and John D.R. Rawlings. Squadron Codes, 1937–56. Cambridge, UK: Patrick Stephens Ltd., 1979. .
 Flintham, Vic and Andrew Thomas. Combat Codes: A full explanation and listing of British, Commonwealth and Allied air force unit codes since 1938. Shrewsbury, Shropshire, UK: Airlife Publishing Ltd., 2003. .
 Halley, James J. The Squadrons of the Royal Air Force & Commonwealth 1918–1988. Tonbridge, Kent, UK: Air Britain (Historians) Ltd., 1988. .
 Jefford, C.G. RAF Squadrons, a Comprehensive record of the Movement and Equipment of all RAF Squadrons and their Antecedents since 1912. Shrewsbury, Shropshire, UK: Airlife Publishing, 1988 (second edition 2001). .
 Moyes, Philip J.R. Bomber Squadrons of the RAF and their Aircraft. London: Macdonald and Jane's (Publishers) Ltd., 2nd edition 1976. .
 Rawlings, John D.R. Coastal, Support and Special Squadrons of the RAF and their Aircraft. London: Jane's Publishing Company Ltd., 1982. .
 Rawlings, John D.R. Fighter Squadrons of the RAF and their Aircraft. London: Macdonald & Jane's (Publishers) Ltd., 1969 (2nd edition 1976, reprinted 1978). .

External links

 No.138 Sqn History RAF.mod.uk
 RAF Bomber Command section – 138 Squadron
 History at RafWeb's Air of Authority – A History of RAF Organisation

138 Squadron
Military units and formations established in 1918
Aircraft squadrons of the Royal Air Force in World War II
Military units and formations disestablished in 1962
Special Operations Executive
1918 establishments in the United Kingdom